Magno José da Silva (born 6 January 1993), commonly known as Maguinho is a Brazilian professional footballer who plays for  Brazilian club Goiás as a right back.

Club career
Born in Dores do Turvo, Maguinho made his senior debut with Tupi at the age of 16 and became the youngest player ever to play for the club. On 9 August 2014, he scored his first goal for the club in a 2–0 win against Macaé.

On 27 December 2014, Maguinho moved to América-RN for the upcoming season. On 8 October 2015, he rescinded his contract with the club although he received an offer of contract extension.

After a short stint with Capivariano in Campeonato Paulista, Maguinho joined Vila Nova on a one-year contract on 25 April 2016. On 13 December, his contract was extended until 2018. On 21 November 2018, it was announced that he would leave the club at the end of the season.

On 31 December 2018, Maguinho moved abroad and joined Japanese club Kawasaki Frontale, on a contract running until 1 January 2020. It was announced on 30 December 2019 that he had joined newly promoted Yokohama FC.

Career statistics

Honours

Club
J.League Cup (1) : 2019
Japanese Super Cup (1) : 2019

References

External links

1993 births
Living people
Association football defenders
Brazilian footballers
Campeonato Brasileiro Série A players
Campeonato Brasileiro Série B players
Campeonato Brasileiro Série C players
Campeonato Brasileiro Série D players
Tupi Football Club players
América Futebol Clube (RN) players
Capivariano Futebol Clube players
Vila Nova Futebol Clube players
Goiás Esporte Clube players
J1 League players
Kawasaki Frontale players
Yokohama FC players
Brazilian expatriate footballers
Brazilian expatriate sportspeople in Japan
Expatriate footballers in Japan